Hyoseris scabra is a species of annual herb in the family Asteraceae. They have a self-supporting growth form. Individuals can grow to 5 cm tall.

Sources

References 

scabra
Flora of Malta